JewTube is a free video sharing website comprising Jewish-oriented user-generated content. It offers a selection of curated Jewish-themed videos. JewTube was founded by Matthew Kwok, a Los Angeles-based entrepreneur, and David Abitbol, founder of Jewlicious.

Visitors to the site view videos on a wide array of Jewish-themed content, with subjects as varied as Jewish cooking and "alternative animated endings" to the Sacha Baron Cohen film Borat.

In September 2007, Google challenged a New York City based company, NetParty, for the use of the name "JewTube", on trademark grounds, as they felt the name was too similar to that of the YouTube video sharing website. NetParty is not related or affiliated with the JewTube website. Google was successful in blocking NetParty's attempt to trademark the name.

References

External links
Website

Jewish culture
Jewish websites
Internet properties established in 2006